Quasipaa exilispinosa is a species of frog in the family Dicroglossidae. It is known under many common names, including Hong Kong spiny frog, common spiny frog, lesser spiny frog, little spiny frog, and Hong Kong paa frog. It has a patchy distribution in southern China including Hong Kong. Its natural habitats are subtropical hill streams in forests or shrublands, and sometimes also seepages, stream-fed marshes, and forests. It is threatened by over-collecting for human consumption and by habitat loss.

As hinted by common names "lesser" or "little" spiny frog, Quasipaa exilispinosa are relatively small among Quasipaa and the related frogs.

References

Quasipaa
Amphibians of China
Fauna of Hong Kong
Endemic fauna of China
Amphibians described in 1975
Taxonomy articles created by Polbot